For other people named Steve King, see Stephen King (disambiguation).

George Stephen King (born June 10, 1951) is a former American football linebacker in the National Football League.  He graduated from Quinton high school in Quinton, Oklahoma in 1969.  He then played for The University of Tulsa.  He also played nine seasons for the New England Patriots, where he was named to their All-1970's team.

1951 births
Living people
People from McAlester, Oklahoma
American football linebackers
Tulsa Golden Hurricane football players
New England Patriots players